A. mertensii may refer to:

 Aechmea mertensii, a plant species
 Agrostis mertensii, the Arctic bent, a grass species in the genus Agrostis
 Amphisbaena mertensii, a worm lizard species found in Brazil